Modi'im may refer to:

Eleazar of Modi'im
Mevo Modi'im